Aaj Aur Kal is a 1976 Pakistani Urdu language social film produced by Irfan Malik and directed by S. Suleman. The lead cast included Shabnam, Rahat Kazmi, Nisho, Ghulam Mohiuddin, Qavi, and Lehri. The film was a remake of director Nazir Ajmeri's Paigham (1964). Aaj Aur Kal was a diamond jubilee hit at the box office and won 8 Nigar Awards for different categories, including the "best film" of the year.

Cast
 Shabnam
 Rahat Kazmi
 Nisho
 Ghulam Mohiuddin
 Qavi
 Lehri
 Tamanna
 Najma Mehboob
 Ibrahim Nafees
 Kamal Irani
 Rangeela (guest appearance)

Release and box office
Aaj Aur Kal was released on 9 April 1976. It achieved a diamond jubilee film status by its successful long run at theaters in Pakistan.

Music and soundtracks
The music of Aaj Aur Kal was composed by Khalil Ahmed and songs were penned by Taslim Fazli:
 Aagay AaGay Dekhiye Hota Hay Kya — Singer: Nahid Akhtar
 Dunya Walo, Jahez Ki Laanat, Aaj To Hay, Kya Kal Bhi Rahya Gi — Singer: Noor Jehan
 Ham Ko Mita Sakay Dunya — Singer(s): Naheed AKhtar & Co.
 Pyar Ka Waada Aisay Nibhayen — Singer(s): Mehdi Hassan, Mehnaz
 Zindagani Ka Safar Kabhi Rukta Nahin, Kabhi Gham Kabhi Hay Khushi — Singer: Nayyara Noor

Awards
Aaj Aur Kal won 8 Nigar Awards for the following categories:

References

1976 films
Pakistani romantic musical films
Remakes of Pakistani films
Urdu-language Pakistani films
1970s Urdu-language films
Nigar Award winners
Pakistani romantic drama films
1976 drama films